Dancemania 2 is the second set in the Dancemania series of dance music compilation albums, released in 1996 by EMI Music Japan.

The megamix album was mixed by Bob Salton, a popular DJ from Italy, and debuted at #11 on Oricon's weekly album chart in July 1996.


Tracks

Further details

The album's overall average tempo is 142 bpm;
The slowest track is "Nightfever" (#1) at 110 bpm.
The fastest track is "Rainbow To The Stars" (#20) at 181 bpm.
Several tracks are cover versions or remix versions.
#1 "Nightfever" is a cover version of Bee Gees' "Night Fever".
#2 "Good Times" is a remix / cover version of Chic's "Good Times".
#3 "Fresh" is a remix / cover version of Kool & The Gang's "Fresh".
#4 "Ring My Bell" is a cover version of Anita Ward's "Ring My Bell".
#10 "Upside Down" is a remix / cover version of Diana Ross' "Upside Down".
Several tracks on the album, including different remixes, can also be found on other Dancemania albums such as 1, Delux, Hyper Delux, Extra, EX1, Zip Mania 1, Zip Mania II, Summers, Summers 2001, Bass #1, Bass #10, Best Red, Speed 2, Speed 3, Speed 9, Speed Best 2001 or Speed G.

References

2
1996 compilation albums
Dance music compilation albums